Irene Frances Adza Mountbatten, Marchioness of Carisbrooke,  (née Denison; 4 July 1890 – 16 July 1956) was born in London, England, the daughter of William Francis Henry Denison, 2nd Earl of Londesborough, and Lady Grace Adelaide (daughter of Francis Fane, 12th Earl of Westmorland). She married Alexander Mountbatten, 1st Marquess of Carisbrooke, a female-line grandson of Queen Victoria.

The first president of the Women’s Automobile And Sports Association (1929).

Marriage and issue
She married Alexander, 1st Marquess of Carisbrooke, son of Prince Henry of Battenberg and Princess Beatrice of the United Kingdom, on 19 July 1917 at the Chapel Royal, St. James's Palace, London.

Lady Irene and Alexander, 1st Marquess of Carisbrooke had one child:

 Lady Iris Victoria Beatrice Grace Mountbatten (13 January 1920 – 1 September 1982)

Awards
She was invested as a Dame Grand Cross of the Order of the British Empire (GBE) and invested as a Dame of Justice of the Order of St John of Jerusalem (DStJ). In Spain, she was invested as a Dame of the Order of Queen Maria Luisa.

She succeeded Princess Beatrice of the United Kingdom as President of the Frank James Memorial Hospital at East Cowes in 1946, carrying on the role until it was taken over by the National Health Service in 1948.

Death
She died on 16 July 1956, aged 66, in London. Her ashes were interred at St. Mildred's Church, Whippingham, Isle of Wight.

Honours

British
  Dame Grand Cross of the Most Excellent Order of the British Empire 
  Dame of Justice of the Most Venerable Order of the Hospital of St John of Jerusalem

Foreign
  Spain: 1080th Dame of the Royal Order of Noble Ladies of Queen Maria Luisa

Citations

References

1890 births
1956 deaths
British marchionesses
Daughters of British earls
Dames Grand Cross of the Order of the British Empire
People from London
Dames of Justice of the Order of St John
Irene
Burials at St. Mildred's Church, Whippingham
Irene
Wives of knights